The Prehospital Immediate Care and Trauma (PICT) Team is a prehospital care team which operates from Raigmore Hospital emergency department in Inverness, Scotland. It receives funding from NHS Highland, BASICS Scotland and the Scottish Trauma Network. They are a stand-alone enhanced care team responding to trauma and other critical care incidents in Inverness and the Northwest Highlands, utilising a rapid response car. PICT comprises either a senior doctor from Raigmore Hospital or a local GP, together with a Scottish Ambulance Service advanced rural practitioner. In light of the sparsely distributed ambulance resources in the Highlands and the challenges of distance and weather in the north west of Scotland, PICT has a considerable remit beyond trauma. PICT provides support to ambulance crews and community responders in medical emergencies, and also provides a "see and treat" service to patients in order to prevent transport and possible hospital admission for problems manageable at home. In this way PICT acts as a senior decision maker for prehospital clinicians across the North of Scotland.

The team was also the winner of the 2022 Highland Heroes awards in the category of Emergency Services.

Remit and workload 

PICT currently operates 12 hours per day, seven days a week across the Highlands and Moray. They respond to around 150 patients a month, attending a range of 999 calls, but being tasked to the most serious calls (major trauma, cardiac arrests etc). For comparison, MEDIC 1 in Edinburgh attended around 3 patients a month in the decade between 1980 and 1990, the Tayside Trauma Team (TTT) attends to 5.6 patients a month, each of the EMRS teams attend 12 primary retrievals a month, while an individual BASICS Scotland volunteer responder may attend 2-3 calls a month.

† NHS Funded             * Charity Funded

The PICT Team responds by land to major trauma (as an integrated part of the Scottish Trauma Network) and critically unwell patients in the Highlands of Scotland. The doctor on the PICT Care will also assume the role of the medical incident officer when required at a major incident. They work to standard operating procedures, and national clinical guidelines for best practice. The team currently responds in a Scottish Ambulance Service vehicle. When audited, it was found that the PICT Team were able to discharge on scene 22% of the cases they attended; 17% of their patients were paediatrics, and 39% were traumatic injuries. 

The PICT Team have attended a variety of incidents, including aircraft crashes, road traffic collisions, stabbings, shootings and critically unwell patients.

Enhanced Medical Care 
In addition to providing senior decision making support, the PICT Team provide a number of clinical interventions which currently lie outwith the standard remit of a Scottish Ambulance Service paramedic, such as;

The administration of:

 ketamine, levobupivicaine (and intralipid if required), adenosine, magnesium sulfate, fentanyl or diamorphine.

Undertaking:

 Diagnostic and procedural ultrasound, wound closure, joint reduction, regional anaesthesia, sedation, pacing, cardioversion, thoracostomy (and drain insertion), mechanical CPR device deployment, amputation or surgical airway.

Personnel

Doctors 
The PICT doctors include consultants in the critical care aligned specialties of emergency medicine, intensive care medicine, acute medicine and anaesthesia. In addition to this there are consultants in obstetrics and gynaecology and speciality doctors from anaesthesia and intensive care. There are also a number of GPs with further training in prehospital emergency medicine who work as rural practitioners, emergency practitioners or rural GPs across the Highlands and Islands.  The doctor on the PICT car will assume the role of the medical incident officer when required at a major incident.  The clinical lead is Dr Luke Regan. Regan is a consultant in emergency medicine and holds the diploma in retrieval and transfer medicine.

Advanced practitioners 
The advanced practitioners in pre-hospital care of the PICT Team are a cohort of clinicians from a paramedic or nursing parent specialty who are currently in training with PICT and in the emergency department at Raigmore Hospital This is a new advanced practice role introduced with funding from the Scottish Trauma Network and represents a collaboration between PICT, NHS Highland and the Scottish Ambulance Service. The role of the advanced rural practitioner is designed to support PICT doctors in managing trauma and medical emergencies, including undertaking the blue light (emergency) driving to attend these calls. The advanced practitioners all undertake a master's degree to fulfil this role. Once fully trained, they utilise critical care clinical competencies, and a number of primary care competencies to allow safe management of patients in the community or en route to hospital.

PICT funding crisis 

NHS Highland announced in early 2022 that they would defund the Inverness PICT Team, in steps which will leave the Highlands and Inverness without a seven-day physician-led enhanced care service. This led to the local MSP Sir Edward Mountain to campaign to save this prehospital resource from defunding. Mountain stated that "This pioneering service is essential when responding to major trauma incidents across the Highlands  we simply cannot afford to lose it."In 2023 the PICT Team secured ongoing funding as was able to recruit a permanent cohort of physicians.

Awards

Medic of the Year 2021 
In early 2022, Dr Luke Regan, the PICT Team clinical lead, was awarded "Medic of the Year 2021" by the College of Remote and Offshore Medicine and invited to join their Council of Members for his work relating to the provision of trauma care across the Highlands of Scotland.

Highland Heroes 2022 
In March 2022, the PICT Team was awarded Highland Hero Emergency Services Hero of the Year for their life-saving work across the Scottish highlands.

See also
 Emergency Medical Retrieval Service
 Emergency medical services in the United Kingdom
 Air ambulances in the United Kingdom

References

External links



NHS Scotland
Scottish Government
Emergency services